Night Train is a 1999 film directed by Les Bernstien and starring  John Voldstad, Barry Cutler, Nikoletta Skarlatos, Pedro Aldana, Donna Pieroni and Dan Shor. Night Train was filmed almost entirely in the border city of Tijuana, Mexico.

External links 

1999 films
Rail transport films
Films shot in Tijuana
1999 drama films
American drama films
American neo-noir films
1990s English-language films
1990s American films